Cajun or Cajan refers to a people and culture of French descent in Southern Louisiana:
Cajuns, an ethnic group of French descent in Southern Louisiana
Cajun Country
Cajun cuisine
Cajun English
Cajun French
Cajun Jig
Cajun Jitterbug
Cajun music
Alabama Creole people, also known colloquially as Cajans or Cajuns
Ragin' Cajuns, nickname of the University of Louisiana at Lafayette athletic teams (1960s–)
Cajundome
Cajun Field
see also Ragin' Cajun (disambiguation) for other uses

Other names:
Cajun (horse)
Cajun (rocket), Cajun Dart and Nike-Cajun, American sounding rockets (1950s–1970s)
Cajun Cliffhanger, amusement ride at Six Flags Great America (1976–2000)
Cajun Navy
Louisiana Cajun Pelicans, American Basketball Association team based in Baton Rouge (2005–)